Menon (fl 431 BC) commanded a faction of Pharsalians who were among the Thessalians who came to the assistance of the Athenians when they were being attacked by the Peloponnesian army in the first year of the Peloponnesian War, 431 BC.  At the time, he led a cavalry that was involved in a skirmish at Phrygia.  He may be the son or grandson of Menon I of Pharsalus, and he may be the grandfather of Menon III of Pharsalus (who appears in Plato's Meno), via his son Alexidemus.

References

Bibliography
Thucydides, History of the Peloponnesian War, Bk II, line 22
Roland Grubb Kent, A History of Thessaly: From the Earliest Historical Times to the Ascension of Philip V. of Macedon, 1904, ch V, pp 20–21
A Dictionary of Greek and Roman Biography and Mythology, Ed. William Smith, 1876, Vol 2 pp 1043–1044

External links
Thucydides' History of the Peloponnesian War, Book II, Jowett trans.

Ancient Thessalian generals
5th-century BC Greek people
People of the Peloponnesian War
People from Farsala